The Polycladida represents a highly diverse clade of free-living marine flatworms. They are known from the littoral to the sublittoral zone (extending to the deep hot vents), and many species are common from coral reefs. Only a few species are found in freshwater habitats.

Description 
They are distinguished from other related animals by the presence of a folded pharynx, an elongated intestine with numerous complex diverticula, and multiple ocelli.

It refers to the ramified shape of the intestine in these flatworms.

Most polyclads hide away from direct light. However, some of the brightly colored species often are active during the day. With their flamboyant coloring they advertise their potential toxicity to visual predators such as fish.

Development 
Some polyclads develop through a Müller's larval stage.

Ecology 
Often polyclads are associated with other invertebrates, such as bivalve mollusks, sponges, corals, or ascidians. In such associations, the worms may use the invertebrates as a source of food, or they may find protection from predators inside the structural framework of these hosts.

Systematics 
The order Polycladida is divided into the two suborders, Cotylea and Acotylea, based on the character "presence/absence of a cotyl or sucker". Of the two, the Acotylea is the larger group with over 26 families worldwide. Acotyleans are major predators of sessile marine invertebrates such as all commercial bivalves species (including pearl and rock oysters), mussels, scallops and giant clams. Acotyleans are dull in coloration, and cryptic in their behavior, hiding in crevices and under coral during the day. 

Cotyleans, on the other hand, with as many as 16 families, are prominent members of tropical coral reef communities and have bright, colorful bodies. Although cotylean flatworms are conspicuous predators in subtropical and tropical ecosystems, they are difficult to study. These worms are very fragile and when disturbed can break apart.

Some examples of Polycladida families are as follows:
 Discocelidae
 Cestoplanidae
 Planoceridae
 Stylochidae
 Ditremageniidae
 Prosthiostomidae
 Opisthogeniidae
 Pseudocerotidae

Phylogeny 
In 2017, molecular analyses produced well-supported phylogenetic hypotheses that confirmed the monophyly of Polycladida, as well as that of Acotylea and of Cotylea.

Images

References 

Turbellaria